Little Marlow is a village and civil parish in Buckinghamshire, England.

History 

The Church of England parish church of Saint John the Baptist lies at the heart of the village, not far from the river and next to the Manor House. The original construction of the church is Norman, dating from the final years of the 12th century. Most of the building was built during the 14th and 15th centuries.

Little Marlow was once the site of a Benedictine convent dedicated to the Blessed Virgin Mary. The convent belonged to Bisham Abbey. It was seized by the Crown in the Dissolution of the Monasteries in 1547 and was eventually demolished in 1740. Today the village is in a scenic location on the River Thames, although home to a large sewage works and gravel extraction plant.

There are two public houses in the village: the Kings Head and the Queens Head.

Geography 

Little Marlow is located along the north bank of the River Thames, about a mile east of Marlow. The toponym "Marlow" is derived from the Old English for "land remaining after the draining of a pool". In 1015 it was recorded as Merelafan. Little Marlow is surrounded by the Little Marlow Lakes Country Park. 

Hamlets in the parish of Little Marlow include Coldmoorholme, Fern, Handy Cross, Sheepridge, and Winchbottom.

The village cottages are set around a large space, surrounded by lime trees, that is used as a cricket ground and village green where an annual fête is held.

Culture 
Little Marlow appears briefly in Mary Shelley's 1826 science fiction novel The Last Man, in a sequence where the novel's protagonist recounts how the village's residents went about trying to prevent themselves from falling ill with the plague.

Mel B was a one-time resident of Little Marlow.

Since January 2021, Little Marlow has been used as a filming location for the Star Wars series Andor.

References

External links
 Little Marlow Parish Council
 Little Marlow Cricket Club
 St John the Baptist, Little Marlow
 The King's Head public house
 The Queens Head public house

Villages in Buckinghamshire
Civil parishes in Buckinghamshire